Little Washington is a now mostly uninhabited African American village in Loudoun County, Virginia, United States.

Geography
It is located south of Gleedsville off The Woods Road. Little Washington lies on a hill overlooking Gleedsville Cemetery where the community once consisted of several homes belonging to the Washington family.

Education
Little Washington was served by the Mountain Gap Colored School, which remained standing until the 1980s, when it burned down.

References

Unincorporated communities in Loudoun County, Virginia
Unincorporated communities in Virginia